Panyjima is an Australian Aboriginal language spoken in the Hamersley Range, in the Pilbara region of Western Australia. It is the traditional language of the Panyjima people. The name has also been spelled Bandjima, Banjima, Banyjima, Paanjima, Pandjima, Panjima, Panjtjima, and Panytyima.

Like most indigenous Australian languages, Panyjima is endangered. Younger generations have English as a first language and make little distinction between Panyjima and its closely related neighbouring languages.

Classification
Panyjima is classified as a member of the Ngayarta branch of the Pama–Nyungan languages. Under Carl Georg von Brandenstein's 1967 classification, Martuthunira was classed as an Inland Ngayarda language, but the separation of the Ngayarda languages into Coastal and Inland groups is no longer considered valid.

Phonology
Orthography in brackets when it differs from IPA.

Consonants

Vowels

The long vowels are rare.

Grammar

Accusative alignment

Unlike most Australian languages, which exhibit ergativity, Panyjima and the other Ngayarta languages have an accusative alignment. That is, the subjects of transitive verbs are treated the same as the subjects of intransitive verbs, while the objects are treated differently.

References

External links
Handbook of Western Australian Languages South of the Kimberley Region — Banyjima

Ngayarda languages